Ridaküla may refer to several places in Estonia:

Ridaküla, Lääne-Viru County, village in Kadrina Parish, Lääne-Viru County
Ridaküla, Tartu County, village in Puhja Parish, Tartu County
Ridaküla, Rapla County, village in Rapla Parish, Rapla County
Ridaküla, Viljandi County, village in Viiratsi Parish, Viljandi County